Hasan-e Mazlum (also Romanized as Ḩasan-e Maẓlūm; also known as ʿĀsmīyeh) is a village in Jazireh-ye Minu Rural District, Minu District, Khorramshahr County, Khuzestan Province, Iran. At the 2006 census, its population was 27, in 5 families.

References 

Populated places in Khorramshahr County